Razguri is a settlement in the Municipality of Sežana in the Littoral region of Slovenia.

Church

The local church, built outside the settlement, is dedicated to Saint Anne and belongs to the Parish of Vrabče.

References

External links
Razguri on Geopedia

Populated places in the Municipality of Sežana